The men's épée was one of eight fencing events on the fencing at the 1972 Summer Olympics programme. It was the sixteenth appearance of the event. The competition was held from 4 to 6 September 1972. 71 fencers from 28 nations competed. Each nation was limited to three fencers. The event was won by Csaba Fenyvesi of Hungary, the nation's second consecutive victory in the event. His countryman Győző Kulcsár, the 1968 gold medalist, earned bronze this time to become the ninth man to win multiple medals in the men's individual épée. Silver went to Jacques Ladègaillerie of France; the French épéeists, a power in the event from 1900 to 1932, earned their first individual medal in 40 years. The three-Games podium streak of the Soviet Union was snapped, with all three Soviet fencers reaching the semifinals but eliminated there.

Background

This was the 16th appearance of the event, which was not held at the first Games in 1896 (with only foil and sabre events held) but has been held at every Summer Olympics since 1900.

Three of the six finalists (the three medalists) from the 1968 Games returned: gold medalist Győző Kulcsár of Hungary, silver medalist (and 1964 gold medalist) Grigory Kriss of the Soviet Union, and bronze medalist (and 1964 fourth-place finisher) Gianluigi Saccaro of Italy. Kriss was the reigning (1971) World Champion.

Hong Kong and Turkey each made their debut in the event. The United States appeared for the 15th time, most among nations, having missed only the 1908 edition of the event.

Competition format

The 1972 tournament returned to the traditional format of entirely pool-play rounds, after two Games of mixed pool-play and knockout rounds in 1964 and 1968. Five rounds were held. Bouts were to 5 touches, with double-losses possible. No barrages were held; touch quotient (touches for divided by touches against) was used to break ties.

 Round 1: 12 pools, with 6 fencers in each pool. The top 4 fencers in each pool advanced, cutting the field from 72 to 48.
 Round 2: 8 pools, with 6 fencers per pool. The top 3 fencers advanced, reducing the number of remaining fencers from 48 to 24.
 Quarterfinals: 4 pools, with 6 fencers per pool. The top 3 fencers advanced, cutting 24 quarterfinalists to 12 semifinalists.
 Semifinals: 2 pools, with 6 fencers each. The top 3 fencers advanced, resulting in 6 finalists.
 Final round: A final pool with the 6 remaining fencers determined the medals and 4th through 6th place.

Schedule

All times are Central European Time (UTC+1)

Results

Round 1

Round 1 Pool A

Round 1 Pool B

Round 1 Pool C

Round 1 Pool D 

Maier was unable to complete his first bout, collapsing during the competition. He "was rushed to the hospital but was rendered quadriplegic from uncertain causes, although a blood clot on the brain was suspected." The bout was not counted in the official results, with the remaining fencers in the pool competing as if the pool had only 5 members.

Round 1 Pool E

Round 1 Pool F

Round 1 Pool G

Round 1 Pool H

Round 1 Pool I

Round 1 Pool J

Round 1 Pool K

Round 1 Pool L

Round 2

Round 2 Pool A

Round 2 Pool B

Round 2 Pool C

Round 2 Pool D

Round 2 Pool E

Round 2 Pool F

Round 2 Pool G

Round 2 Pool H

Quarterfinals

Quarterfinal A

Quarterfinal B

Quarterfinal C

Quarterfinal D

Semifinals

Semifinal A

Semifinal B

Final 

Ladègaillerie had a touch-quotient of 1.211, Kulcsár had 1.053, and Pongratz had 0.950.

Final classification

References

Fencing at the 1972 Summer Olympics
Men's events at the 1972 Summer Olympics